Rollinia ubatubensis is a species of plant in the Annonaceae family. It is endemic to Brazil.

References

ubatubensis
Endemic flora of Brazil
Near threatened flora of South America
Taxonomy articles created by Polbot
Taxobox binomials not recognized by IUCN